Jazz Blues Fusion is a live album by John Mayall. The first side is from a gig in Boston at the Boston Music Hall on 18 November 1971, and the second side was selected from two concerts at Hunter College, New York, on 3 and 4 December 1971.

Track listing

Original release

All songs by John Mayall
"Country Road" - 6:55
"Mess Around" - 2:40
"Good Time Boogie" - 8:20
"Change Your Ways" - 3:25
"Dry Throat" - 6:20
"Exercise in C Major for Harmonica" - 8:10
"Got to Be This Way" - 6:15

Charts

Personnel 
 Freddy Robinson - lead guitar
 Larry Taylor - bass guitar
 John Mayall - vocals, piano, guitar, harmonica
 Ron Selico - drums
 Blue Mitchell - trumpet
 Clifford Solomon - alto & tenor saxophone

References

John Mayall albums
Polydor Records live albums
1972 live albums
Albums produced by John Mayall
Live blues albums